The Diocese of Piedras Negras is a Latin Church ecclesiastical territory or diocese of the Catholic Church in Mexico. It is a suffragan in the ecclesiastical province of the metropolitan Archdiocese of Monterrey. The diocese was erected on 8 January 2003. Its cathedra is found within the Catedral Mártires de Cristo Rey in the episcopal see of Piedras Negras, Coahuila.

Ordinaries
Alonso Gerardo Garza Treviño (2003– )

External links

Piedras Negras
Piedras Negras, Roman Catholic Diocese of
Piedras Negras
Piedras Negras